Hot R&B/Hip-Hop Songs is a chart published by Billboard that ranks the top-performing songs in the United States in African-American-oriented musical genres; the chart has undergone various name changes since its launch in 1942 to reflect the evolution of such genres.  In 1969, it was published under the title Hot Rhythm & Blues Singles through the issue of Billboard dated August 16 and Best Selling Soul Singles thereafter.  During that year, 17 different singles topped the chart, based on playlists submitted by radio stations and surveys of retail sales outlets.

In the issue of Billboard dated January 4, Marvin Gaye was at number one with "I Heard It Through the Grapevine", the song's fourth week in the top spot.  Gaye returned to number one in June with "Too Busy Thinking About My Baby" and was one of three acts to have two number ones in 1969 along with James Brown and the Temptations.  Gaye's cumulative total of ten weeks in the top spot was the most achieved by any artist and the six weeks which "Too Busy Thinking About My Baby" spent atop the chart was the year's longest unbroken run at number one.  The chart-topping singles of Brown and the Temptations showcased new developments in black music, as Brown's tracks centred on the funk style, which had been developing since the mid-1960s as a harder-edged alternative to soul music and would continue to grow in popularity in the 1970s, and the Temptations brought new elements to their style leading to their identification with the psychedelic soul sub-genre.

Several acts topped the R&B/soul singles chart in 1969 for the first time, beginning with Tyrone Davis, who replaced Marvin Gaye in the top spot in the issue of Billboard dated February 1 with his first number one, "Can I Change My Mind".  The next number one was also a debut chart-topper, as Sly & the Family Stone reached the peak position for the first time with "Everyday People", which also topped the all-genre Hot 100 chart.  Sly Stone and his band would prove key in the development of the funk and psychedelic soul sounds in the early 1970s.  The Isley Brothers, Joe Simon and the Originals all also gained the first number ones of their careers during 1969.  The year's final number one was "Someday We'll Be Together" by Diana Ross & the Supremes, which reached the peak position in the issue of Billboard dated December 13 and stayed there for the remainder of the year.  It was the group's last single to feature lead singer Diana Ross, who departed early in 1970 for a highly successful solo career.

Chart history

References

1969
1969 record charts
1969 in American music